Prince Alfred's Guard Memorial is a  provincial heritage site in St George's Park in Port Elizabeth in South Africa's Eastern Cape province. The memorial is situated on top of Port Elizabeth's second oldest reservoir. On November 6, 1907 the Honourable Edgar H Walton, MLA, Treasurer General of the Cape Colony, unveiled the memorial to the fallen of the Prince Alfred's Guard.

In 1983, it was described in the Government Gazette as

Design
On each of the four corners of the base of the memorial is a tablet bearing the names of officers and men who fell in the following wars:
Transkei War (1877)
Basutoland War (1880-1881)
Bechuanaland War (1897)
Anglo Boer War (1899 - 1902)

At the foot of each tablet is a laurel wreath.

See also
 Prince Alfred's Guard
 Donkin Heritage Trail

References

External links

 South African Heritage Resource Agency database

Monuments and memorials in South Africa
South African heritage sites
Buildings and structures in Port Elizabeth
Second Boer War memorials
South African military memorials and cemeteries